West Samos ( Dytiki Samos) is a municipality on the island of Samos in the North Aegean region in Greece. The municipality was formed at the 2019 local government reform, when the pre-existing municipality of Samos was divided in two. Its seat is Karlovasi.

The municipality consists of the following two subdivisions (municipal units):
Karlovasi
Marathokampos

References 

Municipalities of the North Aegean
Populated places in Samos
2019 establishments in Greece